Vaud and the Villains is a 15 to 20 piece New Orleans themed stage musical show from the United States.

Based in Los Angeles, California, the group was created by actor Andy Comeau and his wife Dawn Lewis. The couple are known by their stage names, Vaud Overstreet and Peaches Mahoney, when performing with the band. The original inspiration for the band was Bruce Springsteen's album "We Shall Overcome: The Seeger Sessions".

References

Further reading
 Asian Journal
 "Thick as Thieves". Seven Days.
 Ventura County Times
 Santa Barbara Independent
 New Hampshire Public Radio (8:18 broadcast)
 KPBS
 "Vaud and the Villains bring 'cabaret' show to GV". The Union.

External links

Musical groups from Los Angeles